Green is an unincorporated community within Elliott County, Kentucky, United States.

A post office was established in the community in 1899, and named for Robert Kilgore Green, an early settler in the area.   Its post office has since closed.

References

Unincorporated communities in Elliott County, Kentucky
Unincorporated communities in Kentucky